William Meeks may refer to:
 William B. Meeks Jr., American producer, composer and arranger of radio jingles
 William Hamilton Meeks, III, American mathematician